Magda Linette and Sandra Zaniewska were the defending champions, having won the event in 2012, but Zaniewska decided not to participate in 2013. Linette partnered up with Viktorija Golubic.

Linette and Golubic won the tournament, defeating Nicole Clerico and Nikola Fraňková in the final, 6–4, 6–4.

Seeds

Draw

External Links
 Draw

Open Gdf Suez Region Limousin - Doubles
Open de Limoges